MotoGP 4 (often stylized as MotoGP4) is the fourth and last MotoGP game released on the PlayStation 2 published and developed by Namco.

Features
The game features are based on the 2004 MotoGP season. The game allows the player to race in 5 game modes: Quick Race, Time Attack, Championship, Challenges and Multiplayer in a variety of difficulties and weather conditions.

Notable teams and riders

MotoGP
Yamaha Team
 Valentino Rossi
 Norick Abe
Telefónica Movistar
 Sete Gibernau
 Colin Edwards
Honda Team
 Max Biaggi
 Makoto Tamada
Repsol Honda
 Alex Barros
 Nicky Hayden
Ducati
 Loris Capirossi
 Troy Bayliss
Tech 3 Yamaha
 Marco Melandri
 Carlos Checa
Kawasaki Motors Racing
 Alex Hofmann
 Shinya Nakano
d'Antin MotoGP
 Neil Hodgson
 Rubén Xaus
Suzuki MotoGP
 Kenny Roberts
 John Hopkins
MS Aprilia
 Jeremy McWilliams
 Shane Byrne
Proton Team KR
 Kurtis Roberts
 Nobuatsu Aoki
Harris WCM
 Michel Fabrizio
 Youichi Ui
 Chris Burns

250cc
Telefónica Movistar Junior Honda
 Daniel Pedrosa
 Hiroshi Aoyama
Repsol Aspar Aprilia
 Sebastián Porto
 Fonsi Nieto
Safilo Carrera - LCR Honda
 Randy de Puniet
Honda Team
 Toni Elías
 Roberto Rolfo
Aprilia Racing 250
 Alex de Angelis
Aprilia Team
 Manuel Poggiali
Team Zoppini Abruzzo
 Anthony West
 Hugo Marchand
Troll Honda BQR
 Alex Debón
 Eric Bataille
Aprilia Germany
 Chaz Davies
 Johan Stigefelt
Campetella Honda
 Franco Battaini
 Joan Olivé
 Sylvain Guintoli
Yahama Kurz
 Naoki Matsudo
 Erwan Nigon
Aspar Junior Team
 Héctor Faubel
 Dirk Heidolf
Equipe de France-Scarab GP
 Arnaud Vincent
 Grégory Lefort

125cc
Team Scot Honda
 Andrea Dovizioso
 Simone Corsi
Seedorf Racing Aprilia
 Héctor Barberá
 Álvaro Bautista
Safilo Carrera - LCR Aprilia
 Roberto Locatelli
 Mattia Pasini	
Derbi
 Jorge Lorenzo
 Ángel Rodríguez
KTM Red Bull
 Casey Stoner
 Mika Kallio
Master-Mxonda-Aspar Team
 Pablo Nieto
 Sergio Gadea
Worldwide Communications
 Steve Jenkner
 Marco Simoncelli
Matteoni Racing
 Mirko Giansanti
 Jordi Carchano
Angaia Racing
 Julián Simón
 Mattia Angeloni
Gilera Racing Team
 Fabrizio Lai
 Stefano Perugini
Semprucci Malaguti Racing
 Gábor Talmácsi
 Manuel Manna
Elit Grand Prix
 Thomas Lüthi
 Dario Giuseppetti
Ajo Motorsport Honda
 Lukáš Pešek
 Robbin Harms
Road Racing Team Hungary Aprilia
 Imre Tóth
 Vesa Kallio

Circuits
 Phakisa ( South African Grand Prix)
 Jerez ( Spanish Grand Prix)
 Le Mans ( French Grand Prix)
 Mugello ( Italian Grand Prix)
 Catalunya ( Catalan Grand Prix)
 Assen ( Dutch TT)
 Nelson Piquet ( Brazilian Grand Prix)
 Sachsenring ( German Grand Prix)
 Donington Park ( British Grand Prix)
 Brno ( Czech Republic Grand Prix)
 Estoril ( Portuguese Grand Prix)
 Motegi ( Japanese Grand Prix)
 Losail ( Qatar Grand Prix)
 Sepang ( Malaysian Grand Prix)
 Phillip Island ( Australian Grand Prix)
 Valencia ( Valencian Grand Prix)

Additional circuits:
Circuit Paul Ricard in 1990s form,
Suzuka Circuit in 2002 form,
Training circuit (this is the one used at the start of the game for tutorials)

Reception

The game received "average" reviews according to the review aggregation website Metacritic.  In Japan, Famitsu gave it a score of one seven and three eights for a total of 31 out of 40.

References

External links

2005 video games
Grand Prix motorcycle racing video games
Namco games
Racing video games
PlayStation 2 games
PlayStation 2-only games
Sports video games set in France
Sports video games set in Germany
Sports video games set in Italy
Video games developed in Japan
Video games set in Australia
Video games set in Brazil
Video games set in the Czech Republic
Video games set in England
Video games set in Japan
Video games set in Malaysia
Video games set in the Netherlands
Video games set in Portugal
Video games set in Qatar
Video games set in South Africa
Video games set in Spain
Grand Prix motorcycle racing